Ardfert are a Gaelic football team in north County Kerry, Ireland. They are one of two clubs in Ardfert, St Brendan's Hurling Club being the local hurling club. They play in the County Senior Football Championship and Div 1 County League.

By winning the Kerry Junior Football Championship in 2005 by beating Cordal 3–11 to 3–07 they were promoted to the Kerry Intermediate Football Championship and represented Kerry in the Munster Junior Club Football Championship and in that final they beat Erin's Own 1–08 to 0–10 and represented Munster in the All-Ireland Junior Club Football Championship. On 19 February 2006, they won this championship in Croke Park by beating Loughrea 1–07 to 0–09.

In 2006, they won the Kerry Intermediate Football Championship beating Annascaul and represented Kerry at the Munster Intermediate Club Football Championship where they defeated Corofin of Clare 1–06 to 1–04. They then went on to the All-Ireland Intermediate Club Football Championship final winning that as well 1–04 to 0–05 by defeating Eoghan Rua of Derry. They now play in the Kerry Senior Club Football Championship.

Honours
 All-Ireland Intermediate Club Football Championship Winner (2) 2007, 2015
 All-Ireland Junior Club Football Championship Winner (1) 2006
 Munster Intermediate Club Football Championship Winners (2) 2006, 2014
 Munster Junior Club Football Championship Winner (1) 2005
 Kerry Intermediate Football Championship Winners (2) 2006, 2014
 Kerry Junior Football Championship Winners (2) 1987, 2005
 Kerry Novice Football Championship Winner (1) 1981
 St. Brendan's District Senior Football Championship Winners (4) 2002, 2005, 2011, 2016

Kerry County Football League
Ardfert won the Kerry County Football League – Division 5 North in 2003, Kerry County Football League – Division 3 in 2004, Kerry County Football League – Division 3 in 2005 and Kerry County Football League – Division 2 in 2006. After the 2006 win, the club were promoted to Kerry County Football League – Division 1 for the 2007 season.

References

External links
Official Club Website (archived)
Kerry GAA website with all tables and results
Ardfert in County final 2006
Ardfert in All-Ireland club semi-final 2006

Gaelic games clubs in County Kerry
Gaelic football clubs in County Kerry
Association football clubs established in 1979
1979 establishments in Ireland